The IAU 100 km European Championships is an annual, ultrarunning competition over 100 kilometres (60 miles) for European athletes. It is organised by the International Association of Ultrarunners (IAU) and was first held in 1992 – five years after the launched of the World Championships for the distance. The competition features both an individual and national team component. The team race is decided by aggregated the three best times set by a nation's athletes.

In its 22nd edition in 2013, a total of 94 athletes representing 19 countries took part in the competition. Winschoten in the Netherlands has been a frequent host of the event, doing so ten times, including the first three editions. (In other years, the area has held an annual race there – Run Winschoten.) The championships has almost exclusively been contested in Western Europe, with the sole exception being the 2003 event in Russia. The editions of the competition from 2007 to 2012 were jointly held alongside the World Championships, with the European athletes within that race being ranked separately for the continental event.

The most successful athletes of the championships are Giorgio Calcaterra of Italy and Jonas Buud of Sweden. Each has won the men's title three times, as well as having won a silver and a bronze. Three-time champion Jaroslaw Janicki of Poland is the next most successful and Kajsa Berg is the only woman to have won the championships three times. The championship records are 6:16:41 hours for men, set by Belgian Jean-Paul Praet in 1992, and 7:19:51 hours for women, achieved by Tatyana Zhirkova of Russia in 2003. Russia is comfortably the most successful nation of the championships with nine women's gold medals and eight men's gold medals. Italian and Swedish athletes are the next best performers with six titles each. A total of seventeen European nations have reached the podium.

Editions

Medal summary

Men

Women

Men team

Women team

Medal table

Individual race

References

External links
IAU official site

European 100 km
European championships
Recurring sporting events established in 1992
Ultramarathons